Qurdtəpə (formerly Novodmitriyevka) is a village and municipality in the Shamakhi Rayon of Azerbaijan.  It has a population of 804.

References 

Populated places in Shamakhi District